German submarine U-1003 was a Type VIIC/41 U-boat of Nazi Germany's Kriegsmarine during World War II.

She was ordered on 14 October 1941, and was laid down on 18 January 1943, at Blohm & Voss, Hamburg, as yard number 203. She was launched on 27 October 1943, and commissioned under the command of Oberleutnant zur See Werner Strübing on 9 December 1943.

Design
German Type VIIC/41 submarines were preceded by the heavier Type VIIC submarines. U-1003 had a displacement of  when at the surface and  while submerged. She had two shafts and two  propellers.

U-1003 was fitted with five  torpedo tubes (four fitted at the bow and one at the stern), fourteen torpedoes or 26 TMA or TMB Naval mines, one  SK C/35 naval gun, (220 rounds), one  Flak M42 and two  C/30 anti-aircraft guns. The boat had a complement of between forty-four and fifty-two.

Service history
U-1003 participated in two war patrol which resulted in no ships damaged or sunk.

On 7 February 1944, during U-1003s trials, a crewman fell overboard and died while transferring to an outpost boat, near Hela on the Baltic Sea.

U-1003 had Schnorchel underwater-breathing apparatus fitted out sometime before October 1944.

U-1003 departed Bergen, Norway on 9 February, on her second, and last, war patrol. New Glasgow had started preparations for a depth charge attack when she herself was damaged just below the bridge upon colliding with U-1003. Fourteen Allied ships, from Escort Groups C-4, C-25, and C-26, began a massive search for the heavily damaged U-boat but U-1003 managed to elude them. She then sat on the bottom for another 48 hours for repairs, however, on 23 March, the severe damage to the boat forced her crew to scuttle her off the coast of Ireland. Oblt.z.S. Werner Strübing and the remaining 14 crew members were lost.

See also
 Battle of the Atlantic

References

Bibliography

External links

German Type VIIC/41 submarines
U-boats commissioned in 1943
World War II submarines of Germany
1943 ships
Ships built in Hamburg
Maritime incidents in March 1945
World War II shipwrecks in the Atlantic Ocean
U-boats scuttled in 1945